Clemente Mejía (23 November 1928 – 28 March 1978) was a Mexican swimmer who competed in the 1948 Summer Olympics and in the 1952 Summer Olympics.

References

1928 births
1978 deaths
Sportspeople from Acapulco
Mexican male swimmers
Male backstroke swimmers
Olympic swimmers of Mexico
Swimmers at the 1948 Summer Olympics
Swimmers at the 1951 Pan American Games
Swimmers at the 1952 Summer Olympics
Swimmers at the 1955 Pan American Games
Pan American Games bronze medalists for Mexico
Pan American Games medalists in swimming
Central American and Caribbean Games gold medalists for Mexico
Competitors at the 1946 Central American and Caribbean Games
Competitors at the 1950 Central American and Caribbean Games
Competitors at the 1959 Central American and Caribbean Games
Central American and Caribbean Games medalists in swimming
Medalists at the 1951 Pan American Games
Medalists at the 1955 Pan American Games
20th-century Mexican people